Major-General Francis Adrian Wilson,  (12 October 1874 – 6 May 1954) was a senior officer in the British Army who served as Chief of the General Staff in Australia from 1911 to 1912.

Military career
Wilson was commissioned into the Royal Artillery as a second lieutenant on 1 July 1895, and promoted to a lieutenant on 17 November 1897. He served in the Second Boer War in South Africa, during which he was promoted to captain on 6 February 1901. He was mentioned in despatches (including the final despatch by Lord Kitchener dated 23 June 1902), and was awarded the Distinguished Service Order (DSO). The war ended in June 1902, and Wilson returned to the united Kingdom on the SS Syria two months later, arriving in Southampton in early September.

He served as Chief of the General Staff in Australia from 1911 to 1912, and then returned to United Kingdom to prepare for the First World War; his service in that war led to the award of the Companion of the Order of St Michael and St George and the Légion d'honneur.

After the war he became Colonel Royal Artillery for Eastern Command for which service he was awarded the Companion of the Order of the Bath.

Personal life
In 1903, he married Mabel Crosfield, with whom he had a son and a daughter. He died in 1954 at his home near Farnham, Surrey.

References

1874 births
1954 deaths
Military personnel from London
British Army generals
British Army personnel of the Second Boer War
British Army personnel of World War I
Companions of the Distinguished Service Order
Companions of the Order of St Michael and St George
Companions of the Order of the Bath
Royal Artillery officers
Recipients of the Legion of Honour
Chiefs of Army (Australia)